Huanchay District is one of twelve districts of the province Huaraz in Peru.

References

Districts of the Huaraz Province
Districts of the Ancash Region